Bobby Cannavale (born May 3, 1970) is an  American actor. A native of New Jersey, Cannavale gained a reputation after working in the industry for both his character actor roles and his leading man roles on stage and screen. His breakthrough came with the leading role as FDNY Paramedic Roberto "Bobby" Caffey in the NBC series Third Watch which he played from 1999 to 2001. 

He received the Primetime Emmy Award for Outstanding Guest Actor in a Comedy Series for Will & Grace in 2005, and received further nominations for his recurring role on Nurse Jackie (2012, 2013). He won the Primetime Emmy Award for Outstanding Supporting Actor in a Drama Series for portraying Gyp Rosetti in Boardwalk Empire in 2013. Other notable roles include in Vinyl, Mr. Robot and Master of None. He's also starred in the Amazon Prime series Homecoming (2018–2020), the Hulu miniseries, Nine Perfect Strangers (2021), and Netflix's The Watcher (2022).

Cannavale made his Broadway debut in the Theresa Rebeck's 2008 play Mauritius for which he earned a nomination for the Tony Award for Best Featured Actor in a Play. In 2011 he starred in Stephen Adly Guirgis comedic play The Motherfucker with the Hat earning a Tony Award for Best Actor in a Play nomination. He also portrayed Richard Roma in the 2012 revival of David Mamet's Glengarry Glen Ross.

Cannavale has acted in the dramatic films The Station Agent (2003), Win Win (2011), Blue Jasmine (2013), I, Tonya (2017), Motherless Brooklyn (2019), The Irishman (2019), and Blonde (2022). He's also been in comedic films, such as Paul Blart: Mall Cop (2009), The Other Guys (2010), Annie (2014), Spy (2015), and Jumanji: Welcome to the Jungle (2017). He entered the Marvel Cinematic Universe (MCU) portraying Jim Paxton in Ant-Man (2015), and Ant-Man and the Wasp (2018). He's voiced recurring roles for the animated Netflix series BoJack Horseman and Big Mouth.

Early life
Cannavale was born on May 3, 1970 in Union City, New Jersey, where he grew up, the son of Isabel and Salvatore "Sal" Cannavale. His father is of Italian descent, while his mother is Cuban and moved to the U.S. in 1960. He was raised Catholic and attended St. Michael's Catholic School, where he participated in a number of extracurricular activities, including being an altar boy and member of the chorus. When he was 8, Cannavale secured the plum role of the lisping boy, Winthrop, in his school's production of The Music Man and later played a gangster in Guys and Dolls, which cemented his love for performing. Cannavale's parents divorced when he was 13 and his mother moved the family to Puerto Rico. After two years in the American territory, they settled in Margate, Florida. From 1983 to 1986, Cannavale attended Coconut Creek High School, but during his senior year, he was expelled “for being a cutup.” He then returned to New Jersey to live with his grandmother, in order to be closer to New York to launch his acting career and went to summer school to earn a diploma from Union Hill High School.

Career
Cannavale began his acting career in the theater – with no acting training – and gained early film roles in Night Falls on Manhattan (1997) and The Bone Collector (1999), Cannavale became well known when he starred as Bobby Caffey for two seasons on Third Watch. Following this, in 2001, he starred with Alan Arkin in 100 Centre Street – which was written and directed by Sidney Lumet, his then-father-in-law.

In 2002, he joined the cast of Ally McBeal for the last five episodes, but the show was then cancelled. Following this, he starred with Yancey Arias and Sheryl Lee in the miniseries Kingpin. In 2003, Cannavale briefly appeared on the last two episodes of Oz. He also appeared in the film The Station Agent as a man who befriends a little person removed from society. From 2004 to 2006, he had a recurring guest role on Will & Grace as Vince D'Angelo, the boyfriend (and eventual husband) of Will Truman (Eric McCormack). However, in the reboot, they are revealed not to be married. For this role, he won the Primetime Emmy Award for Outstanding Guest Actor in a Comedy Series in 2005. He has also appeared in the films The Guru (2002), Shall We Dance? (2004), Romance & Cigarettes (2005) and Snakes on a Plane, and guest-starred in Sex and the City, Six Feet Under, Oz, Law & Order – and its spin-off series Law & Order: Criminal Intent and Law & Order: Special Victims Unit. He appeared in The Take (2007) as Agent Steve Perelli, alongside John Leguizamo and Tyrese Gibson.

Cannavale serves as the voice of Corado R. Ciarlo, known as "Babe", in the Ken Burns PBS film series The War (the story of World War II) from the perspective of the men who fought in combat and their loved ones at home. He also read the audiobook versions of Richard Price's 2008 novel Lush Life and Ed Falco's 2012 novel The Family Corleone. On August 25, 2008, ABC ordered his pilot Cupid, a remake of the 1998 program which had starred Jeremy Piven and Paula Marshall, to series. In the new version of the series, Cannavale starred opposite Sarah Paulson with script development overseen by original series creator Rob Thomas. ABC debuted Cupid on March 31, 2009, but cancelled the series after less than two months, on May 19, 2009.

In 2008, he received a Tony Award nomination for his role as Dennis in the Broadway play, Mauritius. In 2009, CBS announced Cannavale would reprise his role of Det. Eddie Saccardo on the television show, Cold Case, for three episodes, starting with the third episode of Season 7. Cannavale was in the film The Other Guys (2010), and played the role of Terry Delfino in the film Win Win (2011). He later starred in the Broadway play The Motherfucker with the Hat alongside Chris Rock and Annabella Sciorra. On May 3, 2011 (his 41st birthday), he was nominated for a Tony Award for his leading role in that production.

In 2012 and 2013, he guest-starred in the fourth and fifth season of Showtime's Nurse Jackie, for which he was nominated twice again for the Primetime Emmy Award for Outstanding Guest Actor in a Comedy Series in 2012 and 2013, as well as joining the cast of HBO's Boardwalk Empire, portraying the psychopathic Sicilian gangster Gyp Rosetti in the third season. His performance on Boardwalk Empire won critical acclaim, earning him the Primetime Emmy Award for Outstanding Supporting Actor in a Drama Series in 2013. That same year he also played Lewis, a vengeful clown on Modern Family during the third season, for which he was nominated for Best Guest Performer in a Comedy Series at the 2nd Critics' Choice Television Awards in 2012. TV Guide, in its "Cheers & Jeers 2012" issue, praised Cannavale for this "trifecta of great performances", commenting, "This guy is so good at playing bad, it's scary." He played what Matt Zoller Seitz of RogerEbert.com called a "heroically moving" lead role in Danny Collins in 2015.

Since 2015, Cannavale has been involved with voice-over work for Playing On Air, a non-profit organization that "records short plays [for public radio and podcast] written by top playwrights and performed by outstanding actors." He has starred in three short plays, including Crazy Eights by David Lindsay-Abaire, co-starring Rosie Perez and John Leguizamo; Mere Mortals by David Ives; and 2 Dads by David Auburn.

In January 2020, Cannavale appeared with his real-life partner Rose Byrne in the play Medea, written and directed by Simon Stone.

In 2021, Cannavale played Tony Hogburn in the Nicole Kidman led Hulu miniseries, Nine Perfect Strangers, based on the novel of the same name by Liane Moriarty, of which also featured Melissa McCarthy, Michael Shannon, Luke Evans, Samara Weaving, and Asher Keddie.

In 2022, Cannavale can be seen portraying Dean Braddock in the 2022 Netflix series, The Watcher.

Personal life
From 1994 to 2003, Cannavale was married to actress/screenwriter Jenny Lumet – director Sidney Lumet's daughter and performer Lena Horne's granddaughter – with whom he has a son, actor Jake Cannavale. Cannavale and Jake were cast as father and son in season four of Nurse Jackie.

Cannavale has been in a relationship with Australian actress Rose Byrne since 2012. Their first child was born in 2016, and a second child in 2017.

Filmography

Film

Television

Stage

Awards and nominations

Primetime Emmy Awards

Tony Awards

Other awards

References

External links

 
 
 

1970 births
Living people
20th-century American male actors
21st-century American male actors
American entertainers of Cuban descent
American male film actors
American male stage actors
American male television actors
American male voice actors
American people of Cuban descent
American people of Italian descent
Audiobook narrators
Drama Desk Award winners
Hispanic and Latino American male actors
Lee Strasberg Theatre and Film Institute alumni
Lumet family
Male actors from New Jersey
Outstanding Performance by a Supporting Actor in a Drama Series Primetime Emmy Award winners
People from Margate, Florida
People from Union City, New Jersey
Union Hill High School alumni